Petre Ivan (born 26 November 1946) is a Romanian former football left defender. He spent his entire professional career at Argeș Pitești, winning two league titles, being the team's captain at the second one.

International career
Petre Ivan made his debut for Romania's national team, coming on as a substitute in the 46th minute, replacing Paul Popovici in a friendly which ended 2–2 against Peru. He also played one game which ended 1–1 against Cyprus at the Euro 1980 qualifiers.

Honours
Argeș Pitești
Divizia A: 1971–72, 1978–79

References

External links
Petre Ivan at Labtof.ro

1946 births
Living people
Romanian footballers
Romania international footballers
Association football defenders
Liga I players
FC Argeș Pitești players
Footballers from Bucharest